Tour Eria is a skyscraper of offices, shops and other activities located in the business district of La Défense near Paris, France (precisely in Puteaux). Built in 2021, it takes over from the Tour Arago destroyed in 2017.

In particular, it will host in September 2021 the "Campus Cyber" decided by the President of the Republic Emmanuel Macron and also training activities in cybersecurity.

See also 
 La Défense
 List of tallest buildings and structures in the Paris region
 List of tallest buildings in France

References

External links 
 Tour Eria

Eria
La Défense
Office buildings completed in 2021
21st-century architecture in France